James Gene Barge (born August 9, 1926) is an American tenor and alto saxophonist, composer in several bands, and actor.

Biography 
Born in Norfolk, Virginia in August 1926, he was a founding member of the 1960s band The Church Street Five, which recorded for the locally based label, Legrand Records, operated by Frank Guida. The band included Gene Barge (sax), Ron "Junior" Farley (bass), Willie Burnell (piano), Leonard Barks (trombone), and Emmet Shields (drums).

In 1961, the Dovells reached #2 on the Billboard Hot 100 with a song called "The Bristol Stomp", which refers to Bristol, Pennsylvania, and includes the line "We ponied and twisted and we rocked with Daddy G". Since Gene Barge had earlier co-written "A Night With Daddy 'G' - Part 1" and "A Night With Daddy 'G' - Part 2" (Legrand LEG 1004), many applied the pseudonym 'Daddy G' to him. It is not known whether the 'Daddy G' of that 1961 song lyric was intended to be Gene Barge or Bishop 'Daddy' Grace, a Norfolk, Virginia evangelist, whose church address was the inspiration for the naming of the group.

The lyrics to Gary U.S. Bonds' 1961 hit on Legrand, "Quarter To Three", which were added to the original Church Street Five instrumental, mentions the Church Street Five and Daddy G, and contains the lyrics "With the help last night, of Daddy G" and the exhortation "Blow, Daddy!"

Barge moved from Virginia to Chicago in the early 1960s to widen his music and acting careers. He worked with Chess Records during the 1960s, playing on recording sessions and providing arrangements along with some production work. In the 1970s, he continued to produce as well as arrange records, including Natalie Cole's early hits.

Barge has toured and played with such notables as Fats Domino, Bo Diddley, Big Joe Turner, LaVern Baker, Ray Charles, Chuck Willis, the Rolling Stones and Natalie Cole; and he had roles in major movies starring Gene Hackman, Chuck Norris, Harrison Ford and Steven Seagal. He has also toured in recent years under the pseudonym 'Daddy G.'

Barge has also acted in a handful of movies, including Under Siege and The Fugitive.

Discography

Dance With Daddy "G" (Checker 2994) 1965
With Bo Diddley
The London Bo Diddley Sessions (Chess, 1973)
With Jack McDuff
Gin and Orange (Cadet, 1969)With Malachi ThompsonBlue Jazz (Delmark, 2003) with Gary Bartz and Billy HarperWith Muddy Waters'Muddy, Brass & the Blues'' (Chess, 1966)

References

Sources
The History Makers

External links

 

1926 births
Living people
21st-century American male musicians
21st-century American saxophonists
American blues saxophonists
American male saxophonists
Musicians from Norfolk, Virginia
Record producers from Virginia